Francotiradoes (English: "Snipers") is the debut album by Master Joe & O.G. Black. Released in 2000 by Pina Records and Diamond Collections.

Track listing 
 "Intro"
 "Llegó La Hora"
 "No Hay Quien Pueda" (feat. Karel & Voltio)
 "Oh Gial"
 "La Carta" (diss to Mexicano 777 & Tempo)
 "No Se Me Olvida" (feat. Gavilan)
 "Girla Te Besé" (feat. Rey Pirin)
 "Presten Atención"
 "Bendición Abuela" (diss to Mexicano 777 & Tempo)
 "Entra Sin Ropa" (feat. Sir Speedy)
 "Gracias Por Crearme"
 "Sexolandia" (feat. Guanábanas)
 "Sigo Vivo" (diss to Mexicano 777 & Tempo)
 "Francotiradores" (feat. Jenay, Yaga & DJ Blass)

Master Joe & O.G. Black albums
2000 albums
Pina Records albums